The M10 was a motorway in Hertfordshire, England, running for approximately 3 miles (4.5 km) from the M1 motorway at junction 7 near Hemel Hempstead to the A414 North Orbital Road at Park Street Roundabout, just south of St Albans. Opened in 1959, it was reclassified as part of the A414 in 2009.

History
The M10 opened on 2 November 1959 along with the M1 and M45, and was designed and constructed by Tarmac Construction as part of the St Albans bypass (along with the M1 between junctions 5 and 10).

At the time, the M1's southern terminus was at junction 5 at Berrygrove, with the main route from there to the A1 in London being via the A41 Watford Bypass. Since the capacity of the A roads was much less than that of the motorway, a distributing spur was required to split up the traffic and reduce congestion at Berrygrove. The M10 was thus built to distribute southbound traffic on the M1 onto the A5 (now A5183) and, as an alternative, via the North Orbital Road and the A6 to the A1 Barnet Bypass.

The M45 was the equivalent distributing spur at the northern end of the M1, and is thus regarded as a sister motorway to the M10.

In later years, as the M1 was extended southwards into London and the M25 was built, the M10's original purpose eroded. It was sometimes suggested that the motorway might have been extended to meet the M25 at junction 22, but this was never proposed.

Downgrade
In December 2008, widening of the M1 between the M25 and Luton was completed, with non-motorway collector/distributor lanes built to link junction 8 of the M1, at Hemel Hempstead, with junction 7 and the M10. As traffic could now travel between Hemel Hempstead and Park Street Roundabout without having to access the M1, there was no need to keep the M10 as a motorway. Hence, on 1 May 2009, the M10 was downgraded to an A road, and designated as part of the A414. This also released the "M10" designation for use elsewhere.
This also had the added bonus of allowing lorries to park when waiting for access to a proposed rail freight depot. Otherwise if the proposed rail freight depot went ahead and it had remained a motorway there would have been nowhere for lorries to wait.

Junctions

See also
List of motorways in the United Kingdom

References

External links
 Roads.org.uk Motorway Database – M10
 Pathetic Motorways – M10
 The Motorway Archive – M1/M10/M45

Former motorways of the United Kingdom
Roads in Hertfordshire
Buildings and structures completed in 1959
Motorways in England